Ahmed Sultan Bin Sulayem (Arabic: أحمد سلطان بن سليّم; born 1978) is an Emirati businessman, and the executive chairman of Dubai Multi Commodities Centre (DMCC), and Jumeirah Lakes Towers (JLT). He is the son of Sultan Ahmed bin Sulayem.

Early life 
In 2000, he obtained a bachelor's degree in business administration from California State University, San Bernardino.

Career 

Bin Sulayem joined DMCC in 2001 as a director, prior to the official launch of the entity in 2002. Bin Sulayem is the chairman of the Dubai Gold & Commodities Exchange (DGCX), which is a DMCC platform.

In June 2013, he received an award from Crowe Horwath for "Government Personality of the Year".

Also in June 2013, Bin Sulayem became recognised as a fan of the LA Lakers due to a full page advertisement he took out in the Los Angeles Times paying tribute to Kobe Bryant. In September 2013, Bin Sulayem hosted Bryant's first trip to the UAE as part of the DMCC Kobe Bryant Health and Fitness Weekend, where he presented Bryant with a DMCC Free Zone license.

In December 2015, Bin Sulayem was appointed chair of the Kimberley Process Certification Scheme for a one-year term.

Jumeirah Lake Towers has become a popular mixed-use communities, said Ahmed Bin Sulayem, Executive Chairman and Chief Executive Officer of DMCC.

See also
Dubai Gold & Commodities Exchange

References

External links

Kimberley Process
Uaezoom biography

Living people
Emirati businesspeople
People from Dubai
1978 births
California State University, San Bernardino alumni